This article is a list of U.S. MIAs of the Vietnam War in the period 1968–69. In 1973, the United States listed 2,646 Americans as unaccounted for from the entire Vietnam War. By October 2022, 1,582 Americans remained unaccounted for, of which 1,004 were classified as further pursuit, 488 as non-recoverable and 90 as deferred.

1968

1969

See also 
 List of United States servicemembers and civilians missing in action during the Vietnam War (1961–65)
 List of United States servicemembers and civilians missing in action during the Vietnam War (1966–67)
 List of United States servicemembers and civilians missing in action during the Vietnam War (1970–71)
 List of United States servicemembers and civilians missing in action during the Vietnam War (1972–75)
 Vietnam War POW/MIA issue
 Joint POW/MIA Accounting Command
 Defense Prisoner of War/Missing Personnel Office
 Defense POW/MIA Accounting Agency

References 

Vietnam War POW/MIA issues
Vietnam War
MIA
1968 in Vietnam
1969 in Vietnam
United States in the Vietnam War